Aghada GAA is a Gaelic Athletic Association club based in Aghada, Cork, Ireland. The club fields both Gaelic football and hurling teams in competitions organized by Cork County Board. The club is part of the Imokilly division of Cork. The former Cork football manager, Conor Counihan is a member of the club.

History
The club was founded in 1885.

Honours
 Cork Senior Hurling Championship Runners-Up 1890, 1897
 Cork Premier Intermediate Hurling Championship Runners-Up 2005
 Cork Junior Football Championship Winners  (1) 1989
 Cork Intermediate Football Championship Winners (1) 1991
 Cork Junior Hurling Championship Runners-Up 1991
 Cork Intermediate Hurling Championship Winners (1) 2017 |Runners-Up 2000, 2005
 All-Ireland Football Sevens Winners (1) 2003
 Cork Minor B Football Championship Winners (2) 2008, 2014
 East Cork Junior Football Championship Winners (4) 1980, 1981, 1983, 1989 |Runners-Up 1977, 1987, 1995
 East Cork Junior Hurling Championship Winners (6) 1931, 1933, 1940, 1980, 1991, 1992 |Runners-Up 1927, 1935, 1939, 1949, 1979, 1989, 1990
 East Cork Under-21 B Football Championship Winners (1) 2013
 East Cork Under-21 B Hurling Championship Winners (1) 1990
 East Cork Under-21 A Football Championship Winners (3) 2014, 2015, 2016

Notable players
 Conor Counihan: All-Ireland Senior Football Championship winning Player 1989, 1990 & Manager 2010
 Kieran O'Connor: 2010 All-Ireland Senior Football Championship winner
 Pearse O'Neill: 2010 All-Ireland Senior Football Championship winner
 Ronan Dwane: All-Ireland Intermediate Hurling Championship winning Player 1997 & Manager 2018

References

External links
Aghada GAA website
Imokilly juvenile GAA website
East Cork GAA board

Gaelic games clubs in County Cork
Gaelic football clubs in County Cork
Hurling clubs in County Cork